Marinobacter antarcticus is a Gram-negative, aerobic, halotolerant, rod-shaped and motile bacterium from the genus of Marinobacter which has been isolated from Antarctic sediments.

References

External links
Type strain of Marinobacter antarcticus at BacDive -  the Bacterial Diversity Metadatabase

Further reading 
 

Alteromonadales
Bacteria described in 2012